Walter Mathews (October 10, 1926 – April 28, 2012) was an American character actor whose credits included roles in television, film and theater.

Mathews was born in New York City on October 10, 1926, and was raised in the Bronx. He earned a master's degree in drama from Ohio University.

Mathews debuted in the Broadway production of King Lear in 1956, which starred Orson Welles. He was a member of the original Broadway cast of Equus, which opened in New York in 1974.

On television, Mathews appeared in a series of commercials for Fram Oil Filters as the original fictional Fram mechanic who promised consumers, "You can pay me now or pay me later." In 1962 Matthews appeared as Mr. Harper on the TV western The Virginian in the episode titled "The Brazen Bell." Mathews also had recurring roles in the Another World and General Hospital soap operas. His additional television credits included Ripcord, Emergency!, Gomer Pyle, U.S.M.C., Murder, She Wrote, Perry Mason, Mannix, Charlie's Angels, Adam-12, Quincy, M.E., Mission: Impossible, Starsky & Hutch, Alice, Medical Center and The FBI.

His film credits included roles in The Naked Kiss (1964), The Lawyer (1970), Beyond Reason (1977), Nighthawks (1981) and Cannery Row (1982).

Mathews made his last on-screen appearance in 1986.

Mathews died of natural causes on April 28, 2012, in Mountain Center, California, at the age of 85.

Filmography

References

External links

1926 births
2012 deaths
American male television actors
American male film actors
American male stage actors
Male actors from New York City
Ohio University alumni
People from the Bronx
20th-century American male actors